Events from the year 1564 in Ireland.

Incumbent
Monarch: Elizabeth I

Events
Shane O'Neill defeats Sorley Boy MacDonnell near Coleraine.

Births
April 2 – William Bathe, Jesuit priest and linguist (d. 1614)

Deaths
February 9 – Manus O'Donnell, clan chief.

References

 
1560s in Ireland
Ireland
Years of the 16th century in Ireland